Love & Rockets Vol. 1: The Transformation is a collaborative album by American rapper Murs and New York DJ Ski Beatz, released on October 11, 2011 by DD172's record label arm BluRoc Records. It was recorded at Camp BluRoc, a recording studio in upstate New York owned by Damon Dash. According to review aggregator website Metacritic, the album received generally favorable reviews from critics.

Track listing
 Epic Salutations
 Remember 2 Forget
 67 Cutlass
 Eazy-E
 Hip Hop & Love
 International
 S-K-I-B-E-A-T-Z
 Westside Love
 Life & Time
 Reach Hire
 Dream On
 316 Ways
 Animal Style

Personnel
Ab-Soul – Featured Artist
Chelsea Baratz – Saxophone
David Barnett – Design, Illustrations
Tabi Bonney – Featured Artist
Kristopher Bowers – Keytar
Matt Brandau – Bass
Will Caviness – Horn
Matt Cody – Engineer
Damon Dash – Executive Producer
Dee-1 – Featured Artist
Embassy the Hitmaker – Producer
Raquel Horn – A&R, Administration
David Linaburg – Guitar
Locksmith – Featured Artist
McKenzie Eddy – A&R, Administration
Murs – Executive Producer, Primary Artist
O.C. – Featured Artist
Harold O'Neal – Keyboards
Darryl Richardson – Photography
Royal P – Producer
Ski Beatz – Engineer, Producer
Greg Newman Spero – Keyboards
Brady Watt – Bass

Charts

References

Murs (rapper) albums
2011 albums
Collaborative albums